The 12853 / 12854 Amarkantak Express is a daily Superfast Express train which runs between the  railway station in Bhopal, the capital city of Madhya Pradesh and Durg, a city in Chhattisgarh state in central India.  This train replaced the 8225/8226 Bhopal–Bilaspur Mahanadi Express along with the 8291/8292 Bhopal–Raipur Express and the 1235/1236 Bhopal–Jabalpur Express.

The name of the train comes from the name of the city Amarkantak, which is a pilgrim town in the Anuppur District from the state of Madhya Pradesh. The Narmada River, which is the largest river in Central India originates near the city.

Arrival and departure information
Train no. 12854 departs from Bhopal Junction daily at 3.40 pm, reaching Durg the next day at 07.55 am. Train no. 12853 departs daily from Durg at 6.20 pm reaching Bhopal Junction the next day at 10:30 am. This train takes in all 29 halts before reaching its destination

Route & Halts
The important stations along the train route are:

 
 
 
 
 
 
 
 
 
 Katni South

Coach composition
The train normally consists of 22 LHB coaches:
 1 AC 1 cum II Tier (HA1) 
 2 AC II Tier(A1 A2)
 3 AC III Tier(B1 B2 B3)
 11 Sleeper coach (S1-S11)
 3 General coach  (G1-G3)
 1 Ladies Reserved coach 
 1 Handicapped coach

As is customary with Indian Railways, coaches are added/removed as per the demand.

Average speed and frequency
This is a daily train service in each direction.  The trains operate at an average speed of 54 km/hour.

Loco Links
The trains are hauled by the following locomotives;

 Itarsi-based WAP-4 / WAP-7 locomotives between Bhopal Junction and Itarsi Junction.
 Itarsi-based WAP-7 locomotive between Itarsi Junction and Bilaspur Junction.

Direction reversal
The train reverses its direction twice at;
 
 .

Other trains from Bhopal to Bilaspur
 12441/12442 Bilaspur Rajdhani Express
 18233/18234 Narmada Express
 18235/18236 Bhopal–Bilaspur Passenger cum Express
 18237/18238 Chhattisgarh Express
 18473/18474 Puri–Jodhpur Express
 12409/12410 Raigarh–Hazrat Nizamuddin Gondwana Express
22909/22910 Valsad–Puri Superfast Express

References

 Indian Railways

Transport in Durg
Transport in Bhopal
Rail transport in Chhattisgarh
Express trains in India
Named passenger trains of India
Rail transport in Madhya Pradesh